Kellie Lodge is a building in Pittenweem, Fife, Scotland. Located at 23 High Street, it is Category A listed.

Some of the three-storey building dates to 1590, but it was largely rebuilt and restored between 1969 and 1971.

An L-plan town house, it is harled with its margins pantiled. It has swept dormer heads and crowsteps, It has a front ashlar stair Anstruther tower (older than the lodge to which it is attached) and a turret stair. The rest of the frontage is in a small forecourt.

The lodge was formerly the residence of the Earls of Kellie.

Gallery

See also
 List of listed buildings in Pittenweem, Fife
 List of Category A listed buildings in Fife

References

1590 establishments in Scotland
Kellie Lodge
Category A listed buildings in Fife